1R may refer to:
Complement component 1R
Intelsat 1R, a communications satellite
Yaesu VX-1R, a radio transceiver
OneRepublic, a pop-rock/alternative band from Colorado, United States
SSH 1R (WA), a former highway that is now Washington State Route 504
1R (chromosome)

See also
R1 (disambiguation)